Roland Herbert 'Roy' Millen (12 October 1893 – 30 May 1946) was an Australian rules footballer who played for Fitzroy in the Victorian Football League (VFL).

Although primarily a wingman, Millen was also used as a centreman at times during his career. He was a member of Fitzroy's premiership team in 1917 and participated in their losing Grand Final the following season.

In the 1929 VFL season he officiated as a field umpire for one match.

References
Holmesby, Russell and Main, Jim (2007). The Encyclopedia of AFL Footballers. 7th ed. Melbourne: Bas Publishing.

External links

1893 births
1946 deaths
Fitzroy Football Club players
Fitzroy Football Club Premiership players
Australian Football League umpires
Australian rules footballers from Melbourne
One-time VFL/AFL Premiership players
People from Prahran, Victoria